Nicholas E. Wagman (1905–1980) was an American astronomer and astrometrist.

Beginning in 1930, Wagman was associated with Pittsburgh's Allegheny Observatory.  He was director of the Observatory and also chairman of the University of Pittsburgh's Astronomy Department from 1941 until 1970. Under his direction, the 0.76-m Thaw refractor was renovated and used to set the standard for parallax determinations, of which over 1200 were made.  Many binary stars were also discovered and characterized.

Named after him
 The Nicholas E. Wagman Observatory of the Amateur Astronomers Association of Pittsburgh in suburban Frazer Township, Allegheny County, Pennsylvania.
 Asteroid 3110 Wagman

References

External links
 Nicholas E. Wagman Observatory web site
 Video of the Thaw telescope

1905 births
1980 deaths
American astronomers
University of Pittsburgh faculty
Scientists from Pittsburgh